Chalerm Yoovidhya (born 1950) is a Thai billionaire businessman and heir to the Red Bull fortune. , Forbes estimates his net worth at US$20.2 billion.

Early life
Chalerm Yoovidhya is the eldest son of Chaleo Yoovidhya, the originator of Krating Daeng and co-creator of the Red Bull brands of energy drinks. His brother Saravoot Yoovidhya runs Red Bull in Thailand, and is a main board director of Kasikorn Bank.

Personal life
Chalerm is married to Daranee Yoovidhya, with three children, and lives in Bangkok, Thailand. Their children are Varangkana Kritakara, Varit and Vorayuth Yoovidhya.

Chalerm and his wife have both been mentioned in connection with the Panama Papers, owning five multi-million-dollar properties in London, via Karnforth Investments which is incorporated in the British Virgin Islands. Their holdings in Red Bull are owned through a complex web of British Virgin Islands companies including Karnforth, Jerrard Company Ltd., and JK Fly. Mossack Fonseca's auditors raised concerns about the arrangements in 2010 and 2013.

See also
 Death of Wichian Klanprasert, a case in which Chalerm's fugitive son Vorayuth is sought by Interpol

References

1950 births
Chalerm Yoovidhya
Living people
Chalerm Yoovidhya
Red Bull people
Chalerm Yoovidhya
Chalerm Yoovidhya
Chalerm Yoovidhya